HMS Achates was a planned Amphion-class submarine of the Royal Navy, launched in 1945 but not completed and expended as a target off Gibraltar in June 1950.

References

Bibliography
 

 

Amphion-class submarines
1945 ships
Cancelled ships